Pollock is an unincorporated community in Idaho County, Idaho, United States. Pollock has a post office with ZIP code 83547.

References

Unincorporated communities in Idaho County, Idaho
Unincorporated communities in Idaho